Krikor Kélékian (February 28, 1898 – 1971), better known as Gregor, was an Ottoman-French jazz bandleader of Armenian origin.

Gregor founded a group called the Gregorians in France in 1928, whose sidemen included Philippe Brun, Edmond Cohanier, and Lucien Moraweck, and which made some early recordings. In 1929-1930 he founded the Revue du jazz, the first publication to cover jazz music in France. In 1930 he led a large ensemble on a tour of South America, including six weeks in Rio de Janeiro, and recorded in Buenos Aires; his bands in the early 1930s included sideman such as Alix Combelle, Stéphane Grappelli, André Ekyan, and Michel Warlop. He died in Malente, Germany, in 1971.

References
Michel Laplace, "Gregor". The New Grove Dictionary of Jazz. 2nd edition, ed. Barry Kernfeld.

1898 births
1971 deaths
French jazz bandleaders

de:Grégor et ses Grégoriens